The LS Tower is the headquarters of the Korean cable manufacturer LS Cable & System and is located in Anyang, South Korea. The construction works for the 20-story building began in 2006 and LS Cable & System moved its headquarters to LS Tower after its completion in 2008. LS Tower was built to host 1500 people, 17 of its 20 stories are above ground level and 3 below. The floors 4 to 10 belong to LS Industrial Systems, the 12th to the 17th to LS Cable & System and the 11th floor is occupied by LS Mtron.
The floors below ground level host a fitness center, several stores and a café / restaurant as well as the building's parking lot.
Also, an Woori Bank, as well as a small exhibition of LS Cable & System's products and the cafeteria are located on the first floor.
On top of the tower, on the 17th floor, there is, apart from several meeting rooms, an Asian garden for the employees of LS Cable & System to relax and to spend their time during breaks.

Location 
LS Tower is located about 200 meters from Geumjeong Station (the closest exit is exit 1), a subway station served by the lines 1 (dark blue line) and 4 (light blue line) of the Seoul Subway. The closest bus stop is "LS 타워" (English: LS Tower), located in front of the building and served by the bus lines 5, 64, 65 and 6–2.

References 

Buildings and structures in Anyang, Gyeonggi
Office buildings completed in 2008